Georgie may refer to:

People
 Georgie Born (b. 1955), British musician and academic
 Georgie Davis (b. 1969), artist name of the Dutch singer Kees Rietveld
 Georgie Friedrichs, Australian rugby sevens player
 Georgie Glen, Scottish actress
 Georgie Jessel (1898–1981), American actor and comedian
 George Pocheptsov (b. 1992), commonly referred to as "Georgie", an American painter, draughtsman and entrepreneur
 Georgie Tapps (1907–1997), American tap dancer

Fictional people
 Georgie Denbrough, a fictional character from Stephen King's horror novel It

In art
 Georgie, a 1944 children's picture book written and illustrated by Robert Bright
 Georgie!, a 1982–84 manga series written by Mann Izawa and illustrated by Yumiko Igarashi

See also
 Georgies
 Giorgi (disambiguation)
 Georgy (disambiguation)
 George (disambiguation)
 Georgia (disambiguation)
 Giorgio (disambiguation)